Good Friends and Faithful Neighbours (Swedish: Goda vänner, trogna grannar) is a 1960 Swedish drama film directed by Torgny Anderberg and starring Edvin Adolphson, Anita Björk and George Fant. The film's sets were designed by the art director Bibi Lindström.

Cast
 Edvin Adolphson as 	Hugo Frejer
 Anita Björk as Mrs. Yvonne Frejer
 George Fant as 	Robert
 Gunnel Lindblom as Margit
 Sif Ruud as 	Dottan
 Mimmo Wåhlander as 	Lena Frejer
 Hans Wahlgren as	Tommy
 Kotti Chave as 	Werner, artist
 Rosemarie Runge as 	Maid 
 Sture Ström as 	Karl-Erik Rosenskiöld 
 Ivar Wahlgren as 	Man at Bromma airport 
 Carl-Gunnar Wingård as 	Bredow

References

Bibliography 
 Qvist, Per Olov & von Bagh, Peter. Guide to the Cinema of Sweden and Finland. Greenwood Publishing Group, 2000.

External links 
 

1960 films
Swedish drama films
1960 drama films
1960s Swedish-language films
Films directed by Torgny Anderberg
1960s Swedish films